Ledbury Town Halt was one of two stations serving the town of Ledbury. It was situated at the junction of  Bridge Street and Bye Street, just to the north of the point where Bridge Street crossed the line. It was opened in 1938 and closed in 1959 when the line was closed to passengers.

The station site can be accessed by the public as part of the Ledbury Town Trail, a footpath which uses part of the old railway line.

References

Further reading

 

Former Great Western Railway stations
Railway stations in Great Britain opened in 1938
Railway stations in Great Britain closed in 1959
Disused railway stations in Herefordshire
Ledbury